Noemi Batki (born 12 October 1987) is a Hungarian-born Italian diver. She is a member of the Italian National Diving Team and is sponsored by Centro Sportivo Esercito/Triestina Nuoto.

Career
She was born in Budapest, Hungary, and at the age of 3 she moved to Belluno, Italy, with her mother, Ibolya Nagy, a Hungarian platform diver who took part in the 1992 Olympic Games in Barcelona.

She won her first medal aged 16 at the Juniores European Championships in Aachen, Germany, where she won the silver medal in the 3 metres springboard synchro competition, together with her teammate Francesca Dallapè, and won the bronze medal in the platform event.

In spring 2005 Batki moved to Trieste. In July 2005 she took part to the FINA World Championships in Montreal, Quebec, Canada, where, at her first world experience, she placed fifth in the 3 metres springboard synchro competition together with good results in the 1 meter and 3 meters springboard competitions. In the same year in Electrostal, Russia, she won her third juniors medal, a silver, in the 3 metres competition.

In 2006, she took part at European Championships in Budapest, her hometown, where she placed 6th in the 3 metres synchro, and in the same year she won a silver medal at Arena Diving Champions Cup in Stockholm.

In 2007, she won a bronze medal at Arena Diving Champions Cup in the 3 metres synchro race and won the gold medal in the same event at the Italian Indoor Championships. She also took part to FINA World Championships in Melbourne, Australia, where she got good results such as the 11th place in 1 meter race and 9th place in 3 metres synchro race.

In August 2007 Batki won the gold medal at 24th Universiade in Bangkok, Thailand, in the 1 metre competition, sharing the same score as the Ukrainian diver Maria Voloschenko.

In February 2008 Batki qualified for the 2008 Summer Olympics, a by placing 5th in the 3 metres synchro competition, together with her mate Francesca Dallapè, at the FINA World Cup in Beijing. At the Olympics Batki and Dallapé placed 6th.

In August 2010 she won the silver medal at European Championships in Budapest, Hungary, in the 10 metres platform race, scoring 343,80, 11 points less than the gold medallist Christin Steuer, from Germany.

In March 2011 Batki won her first gold medal in a European Championship, at 2nd Arena European Diving Championships in Turin, reaching the 1st place in the platform race and scoring 346,35 points, her new personal record. By this result, she also got the qualification for the 2012 Summer Olympics, and so she competed in London and reached the finals for 10 m platform women where she got 8th place. She also competed in 2016 Summer Olympics in Rio where she competed in 10 m platform women and she was placed 26th.

2017

Noemi Batki is going to participate in 2017 Diving World Series in Kazan, where she will feature in the 10m mixed synchro which takes place between 31 March until 2 April. She finished 5th with a score of 297.96.

References

Italian female divers
1987 births
Living people
Sportspeople from Budapest
Olympic divers of Italy
Divers at the 2008 Summer Olympics
Divers at the 2012 Summer Olympics
Divers at the 2016 Summer Olympics
Hungarian emigrants to Italy
Divers of Gruppo Sportivo Esercito
Italian people of Hungarian descent
Universiade medalists in diving
European Championships (multi-sport event) silver medalists
Universiade gold medalists for Italy
Medalists at the 2007 Summer Universiade
Divers at the 2020 Summer Olympics